Synaphea polypodioides is a shrub endemic to Western Australia.

It is found on undulating areas in the South West region of Western Australia where it grows in sandy-loamy-clay soils over laterite.

References

Eudicots of Western Australia
polypodioides
Endemic flora of Western Australia
Plants described in 2007